Jennifer Evans (born 26 November 1982) is a Welsh actress, best known for playing the lead role of estranged Welsh farm girl Cat Williams in the 2005 award-winning (BIFA Raindance Award) horror/comedy feature film Evil Aliens.

She has been cast as The Nurse in a forthcoming adaptation of House of Hell.

Filmography

References

External links

Living people
Welsh film actresses
1982 births
Actresses from Cardiff